Brunswick Street Mall is a pedestrian mall in Fortitude Valley, Brisbane, Australia. The Mall occupies all of Brunswick Street between Wickham Street and Ann Street.

History
Brunswick Street Mall was constructed in 1991, and renovated in 1995.

Brisbane City Council began a redevelopment of the Mall in January, 2014. The project is being built by JMac Constructions (a subsidiary of BMD Group) at a cost of $4,000,000, and is expected to take six months. The redevelopment was originally due to take place in 2016, but was pushed forward to make it ready for the G-20 Summit.

See also
Brunswick Street

References

External links

Pedestrian malls in Australia
Fortitude Valley, Queensland
1991 establishments in Australia